Sayan Plak was a record label established in Unkapanı (Istanbul's music center) in 1966, more recently located in the Kadıköy neighborhood. Most active from 1966 to 1973, they released primarily 45 RPM singles, with a smaller number of EPs and LPs.

Artists
 Edip Akbayram (1974)
 Alpay (1967-8)
 Cem Karaca (1967)
 Fikret Kızılok (1970)
 Erkin Koray (1966)
 Barış Manço (1967-72)
 Mavi Işıklar (1966-9)
 Moğollar (1968-71)

External links
 

Turkish record labels
Record labels established in 1966